Dale Barnstable (March 4, 1925 – January 26, 2019) was an American basketball player from Antioch, Illinois who was banned for life from the National Basketball Association (NBA) in 1951 for point shaving during his college career at the University of Kentucky.

Early life 
Barnstable was born in Antioch, Illinois. Barnstable attended the Antioch Community High School, where he anchored his athletic career.

College career 
After high school, he was recruited by the University of Kentucky where he played for Hall of Fame coach Adolph Rupp at the Kentucky Wildcats men's basketball from 1946 to 1950.  While there, Barnstable was a key player on Rupp's first two championship teams in 1948 and 1949.  Barnstable was a starter on the 1949 team, earning third team All-Southeastern Conference honors that season.  For his Wildcat career, Barnstable scored 635 points (4.9 per game).

Professional career

Boston Celtics (1950–1951) 
Towards the end of his college career, Barnstable was drafted in the seventh round of the 1950 NBA draft by the Boston Celtics.

CCNY point shaving scandal 
In 1951 Barnstable became a key figure in a point shaving scandal – In the wake of an increasing number of point shaving schemes coming to light throughout the year, on October 20 Barnstable was arrested along with teammates Ralph Beard and Alex Groza for allegedly taking $500 to shave points in a National Invitation Tournament game in 1949. Although his sentence was suspended, as a result of the affair he lost his first post-graduation job as a high school coach at duPont Manual High School in Louisville, Kentucky, and was banned for life from the NBA by NBA president Maurice Podoloff.

Personal life 
After losing his high school coaching job, Barnstable worked at American Air Filter in Louisville as a salesman until retirement. In the meantime, he became a talented golfer, winning the Kentucky Senior Open twice and playing in the British Senior Open (the first Kentucky amateur to do so).

Barnstable was the father of identical twin actresses, Priscilla "Cyb" and Patricia Barnstable, known for their roles in the television series Quark.

Barnstable died on January 26, 2019, aged 93.

References

1925 births
2019 deaths
American men's basketball players
Basketball players from Illinois
Boston Celtics draft picks
High school basketball coaches in Kentucky
Kentucky Wildcats men's basketball players
People from Antioch, Illinois
Shooting guards
Small forwards
Sportspeople from the Chicago metropolitan area
Basketball players from Louisville, Kentucky